Unine (stylized as UNINE) was a nine-member Chinese boy band active from April 2019 to October 2020. 

The band was formed by a TV show called Youth with You. The group consisted of Li Wenhan, Li Zhenning, Yao Mingming, Guan Yue, Jia Yi, Hu Chunyang, Xia Hanyu, Chen Youwei, and He Changxi.

History
Unine was formed through the reality survival television show Youth With You, which aired from January 21 to April 6, 2019. It was the second edition of Idol Producer. Out of the 100 trainees, only 9 were to debut through audience votings. In the final episode the debut lineup was announced, in which Li Wenhan had come in first place, followed by Li Zhenning, Yao Mingming, Guan Yue, Jia Yi, Hu Chunyang, Xia Hanyu, Chen Youwei and He Changxi respectively.

Prior to Unine, Li Wenhan debuted in the Chinese-South Korean boy band Uniq in 2014. He also made his acting debut in 2016.

Yao Mingming trained with SEVENTEEN and appeared in Seventeen TV. He was also a contestant in a South Korean survival show Mix Nine, but failed to debut in 10th place. Afterwards, he joined South Korean boy band BLK on November 28, 2017, but the group disbanded on September 17, 2018.

Unine released their first EP, UNLOCK, on May 6, 2019, and their second, UNUSUAL, on October 21, 2019. The group performed title song "Set It Off" at the 2019 Mnet Asian Music Awards' Red Carpet Special Stage.

Unine released their album U-Night Flight of 11 songs on May 6, 2020, and, before their disbandment, the EP UNFORGETTABLE on September 30, 2020.  The group officially disbanded on October 6, 2020.

Members

Endorsements
On 6 April, after their debut, PD Lay Zhang and guest host He Jiong announced the group's logo and that Unine would be the ambassador of 蒙牛真果粒.

Unine were also announced as endorsers of SASELOMO and 海豚家 in 2019.

Discography

Studio albums

Extended plays

Filmography

Television shows

References

External links
 Unine on Sina Weibo

Chinese boy bands
Mandopop musical groups
Youth With You contestants
Chinese pop music groups
Chinese dance music groups
Mandarin-language singers
Musical groups established in 2019
2019 establishments in China
2020 disestablishments in China
Musical groups disestablished in 2020